Men in Love is a 2010 direct-to-video Nigerian drama film directed by Moses Ebere and starring Tonto Dike, John Dumelo and Halima Abubakar. The film tells a story of how a couple experiencing troubles in their marriage has their situation worsened when a cursed homosexual friend visits them.

The film is in two parts. The first part tells a story of how a previously promiscuous husband (Charles) became the love interest of his obsessive homosexual friend (Alex). Further, it establishes that despite his refusing the advances of his gay friend, Alex persisted and eventually raped his friend. The second part of the film explored what led to the homosexuality.

Plot 
Charles (John Dumelo) and Whitney (Tonto Dike) are a young couple with kids. However, their marriage is blurred by the frequent extra-marital affairs by Charles. After being caught in the act with his secretary, Whitney decided to call it quits. Despite conflicting advice from her friends, 
Flora (Halima Abubakar) and Rina, she eventually accepted an apology from her husband for the utmost time. As a way of rejuvenating their marriage, Charles and Whitney decided to go on a vacation. At the hotel, they walked into one of Charles past lovers, which got Whitney irritated. Charles encountered his friend from University of Ibadan, Alex (Muna Obiekwe) who resolved the issue after some personal conversation with Whitney.

After the vacation, Alex took Charles out for lunch and he began discussing with Charles on the benefits of being gay or bi as a man and countered the religious sentiment of Charles on homosexuality. He ended the conversation by opening up to him that he's attracted to men. He continued making 
sexual advances towards Charles, who got uncomfortable by the provocative text, calls and touch. When it became clear that Charles wouldn't reciprocate his advances, Alex tricked Charles into believing he will remain just a friend and got him to attend his birthday party, where Alex drugged and raped him. The part one (75 minutes) ends after Charles woke up the next day and angrily left Alex's house, after assaulting him in annoyance, on discovery that he had forcefully had his way on him.

Cast
 Tonto Dikeh as Whitney
 John Dumelo as Charles
 Muna Obiekwe as Alex
 Halima Abubakar as Flora
 Becky Ogbuefi as Pastor
 Promise Amadi as Bobby
 Ndu Ugochukwu as Cain
 Queen Okoro as Tasha
 Beckky Ogbuefi as Pastor
 Nora Ugo as Barrister
 Tetete as Bishop Duruzor

Reception
Nollywood Reinvented gave it a 2.5 out of 5 rating and concluded that "Interestingly enough, this story is not really as controversial as it was hyped up to be. It in no way addresses the issue of homosexuality in the modern African society.".

Controversies
Following the criticism that followed with his casting in the film, John Dumelo released a statement where he explained that the major reason why he accepted to act in the film "...was just to create awareness that people who are actually gay most likely are under demonic spells." In another interview he stated that he loves women and will never be gay but does not regret taking the role in the film.

See also
 List of Nigerian films of 2010

References

External links
Men in Love on Nollywood Reinvented

Nigerian LGBT-related films
2010 direct-to-video films
2010 films
2010 drama films
Nigerian drama films
Films about rape
2010s English-language films
English-language Nigerian films
LGBT-related controversies in film
Casting controversies in film